Wesley Deenen (born 24 July 1993, in Venray) is a Dutch footballer who plays as a right winger. He played for FC Oss in the Dutch Eerste Divisie.

Club career
Deenen came through the N.E.C. youth system and joined FC Oss on loan in summer 2012. He made his professional debut on 31 August 2012 against Almere City and left Oss after the 2013/14 season.

He left Germania Groesbeek in summer 2016 for fellow amateurs SV Venray.

References

External links
 Voetbal International profile 

1993 births
Living people
People from Venray
Association football wingers
Dutch footballers
TOP Oss players
Eerste Divisie players
Footballers from Limburg (Netherlands)
NEC Nijmegen players